Peter Maurice Hamilton (17 October 1956 – 6 July 2019) was an Australian rules footballer who played for Melbourne in the Victorian Football League (VFL).

Hamilton, despite appearing in eight VFL seasons, could only amass 52 games and spent most of his times playing reserves football. The closest he came to a full season was when he played 13 senior games in 1979. In the same year, he was a Tasmanian representative at the Perth State of Origin Carnival, having played at North West Football Union club Ulverstone early in his career.

References
He went on to play for North Bendigo, Prahran and Kilcunda Bass.

External links

1956 births
Melbourne Football Club players
Ulverstone Football Club players
Tasmanian State of Origin players
Australian rules footballers from Tasmania
2019 deaths